A death knight is a name used in a number of role-playing games.

Death knight, a monster in Dungeons & Dragons
Death knight, a World of Warcraft character class introduced in Wrath of the Lich King
Death Knights of Krynn, a 1991 video game
Deathknight, a title given to the Abyssal Exalted in the game Exalted
DeathKnight, a playable class in DragonFable from Artix Entertainment which also appeared in AdventureQuest and AdventureQuest Worlds
Deathknight, a low-level champion in the game RAID: Shadow Legends also featured in many of the game video ads, usually as the butt of the joke